Sürmene (Greek: Σούρμενα, Sourmena; , romanized as Sürmena[/e]) is a small town and district of Trabzon Province in the Black Sea region of Turkey. In ancient times the town of Hyssus or Hyssos was nearby. The mayor is Rahmi Üstün (AKP).

Known in antiquity also as Susarmia or Augustopolis, it lies on the River Kora (Manahoz Deresi) and is best known as the place where Xenophon and his Ten Thousand fell sick after eating wild honey, an event which was confirmed by the local people. In the village of Kastil,  to the west of Sürmene, stands a ruined medieval castle as well as the impressively restored 18th-century Yakupoğlu Memiş Ağa Konağı mansion. This was formerly the seat of the Yakupoğlu family, who lived here as rulers (derebeys, hence its alternative name of Derebeyli Kale, the Castle of the Derebeys) of the surrounding region relatively free of interference from the Ottoman government in faraway Constantinople/Istanbul.

Economy
Historically, Sürmene produced small amounts of manganese. The area also had mineral springs, and shipped bottled water to Istanbul.

Flora and fauna
According to WWF the largest amount of endemic flora is to be found in the Ağaçbaşı yayla (summer upland pasture) in Surmene.

 Zehirli biberiye (Andromeda polifolia),
 Böcek yiyen bitkilerden Drosera,
 Pamukotu (Eriophorum angustifolium ve E. latifolium),
 Kurtayağı (Lycopodiella inundata),
 Kara ot (Rhynchospora alba)

Gallery

See also
Memiş Aga Mansion
Memiş Agha
Madur
Anabasis (Xenophon)
Ten Thousand
Sürmene knife

References

External links

District governor's official website
District municipality's official website* Surmenem.com - A local website about Sürmene

 
Populated places in Trabzon Province
Populated coastal places in Turkey